Nang Mwe San (born 23 June 1988) is a Burmese model and former medical doctor. She is considered as the country's most famous sexy model, according to The Myanmar Times. She is featured in The Irrawaddy's "Top Myanmar Sexy Models" list in 2020. In July 2020, she was appointed Kindness Ambassador of YVCT College.

On 5 August 2022, in the aftermath of the 2021 Myanmar coup d'état, she was arrested by the military junta under Section 33(a) of Electronic Law for earning money by accused of harming Myanmar culture and posting sexually revealing photos on the websites OnlyFans and Exantria, along with Thinzar Wint Kyaw, a popular actress and sexy model. She is said to have become the first person imprisoned in Myanmar for content on OnlyFans after being sentenced to six years in prison.

Early life and education
Nang Mwe San was born on 23 June 1988 in Kunhing, Shan State, Myanmar into a medical family. Her father Sai San Win, was a medical doctor who served as a deputy project medical coordinator at Médecins Sans Frontières, and mother Kyu Kyu Swe, is also a physician. She attended high school at Basic Education High School No. 2 Kamayut. After passing her matriculation exam with flying colours, she entered the University of Medicine 1, Yangon. She became a trained physician at the age of 22. She worked as a medical officer for local hospitals and NGO's in Shan, Kachin, and Rakhine States, including in displaced camps for the Rohingya Muslims.

Career
She began posting sexually charged photos in swimwear and lingerie on social media as a hobby, drawing an audience and commercial appearances. She has appeared in several television advertisements including OK Dollar, Biomanic Plus and other commercials. Her sexually charged photos led the malaria monitoring and evaluation office in Yangon, where she worked as a medical officer, to demand her resignation. In 2019, the national Medical Council revoked her medical license and ordered her to stop working as a (sexy) model and made sure she couldn't work as a doctor again when she didn't. Nang Mwe said the confiscation of her medical license was a violation of her human rights, and the case and Myanmar Medical Council has been widely criticized in Myanmar and has been widely reported in the international media.

Emphasizing the line between her work as a sexy model and traditional pornography has helped ease the stigma of her career choice in a country where little distinction is made between the two. Although her ban from the medical profession caused controversy, it has also boosted her popularity and made her a national sex symbol. In 2019, she walked the fashion runway at the Myanmar International Fashion Week.

At the end of 2019, she became the fourth highest trending individual in Myanmar, according to Google. She joined OnlyFans in September 2020, right in the middle of the COVID-19 pandemic, after getting requests from fans. Nang Mwe San said she made US$50,000 in one month. Her videos also featured prominently on PornHub and TubeSafari, but are mainly compilations of photos from hotel shoots. She believes she is the first model from Myanmar active on the platform.

Political activities
Following the 2021 Myanmar coup d'état, she participated in the anti-coup movement both in person at rallies and through social media channels with 2.2 million followers. She joined the "We Want Justice" three-finger salute movement. The movement, launched on social media, has been joined by many celebrities. She speaks up on the country's military coup via videos and protested with the people in front of the Embassy of the United States, Yangon. She says,

In May 2022, Nang Mwe San banned from travel to overseas. The Yangon Passport Office has refused to return her passport after she tried to renew it for her father's medical treatment in Bangkok. As a result, her father Dr Sai San Win, died due to a lack of medical treatment. She has reportedly complained the decision was "unfair" and essentially removed her right to leave Myanmar. Her permission to travel can only be granted by the country's home affairs minister Soe Htut. In a media interview, Nang Mwe San announced that she has retired as a sexy model and said, "I have to go back to being a doctor to make my father proud".

On 5 August 2022, The military junta has opened a legal case against Nang Mwe San and another popular sexy model Thinzar Wint Kyaw as the due are accused of harming Myanmar culture and distributing sexually explosive photos and videos on social networks. According to an announcement by state controlled media MRTV, they have been arrested and detained under Section 33(a) of Electronic Law for earning money by posting sexually revealing photos on the websites OnlyFans and Extrania. The section 33(a) of Electronic Law carries a maximum 15 years jail sentence. She was not allowed to have a lawyer and had fewer rights. On 27 September 2022, she was sentenced to six years jail  by a military court.

References

External links 

1988 births
Living people
Burmese female models
Burmese activists
People from Shan State
OnlyFans creators